Emma Jackson (born 1991 in Joyner, Brisbane, Queensland) is an Australian professional triathlete, U23 World Champion of the year 2010, and 2009 Junior World Championships silver medalist.

From 2007 to 2010 Jackson took part in 16 ITU competitions and achieved 11 top ten positions. On 1 November 2009 she won the Australian Noosa Triathlon ($12.000) and since then for Australian media it is commonplace to mention Emma Jackson together with the famous three Australian triathlon Emmas: Emma Carney, Emma Snowsill, and Emma Moffatt.

Emma Jackson is coached by Stephen Moss, the head coach of the state run high performance centre called Queensland Academy of Sport, and represents Moss' Pine Rivers Triathlon Club.

In 2010, Emma Jackson also represented the French club TCG 79 Parthenay in the prestigious Club Championship Series Lyonnaise des Eaux. At the Triathlon de Paris (18 July 2010), she placed 2nd and her club placed 4th, at Tourangeaux (29 August 2010) she placed 9th and her club placed 5th, and at the Grand Final in La Baule (Triathlon Audencia, 18 September 2010), immediately after her U23 World Championship gold medal, she placed 16th and her club 4th. Thus Jackson was always among the three triathlètes classants l'éqipe, i.e. the three best athletes on whose results the club ranking is based. At the triathlon in La Baule, TCG 79 Parthenay had no French triathletes at all among its three classants: Ainhoa Murua placed 11th, Nicky Samuels 13th and Jackson 16th.

At the 2012 Summer Olympics, she competed for Australia, finishing in 8th place.  At the 2014 Commonwealth Games, she won a bronze medal in the mixed relay with Emma Moffatt, Aaron Royle and Ryan Bailie.

ITU competitions 
In the four years from 2007 to 2010, Jackson took part in 17 ITU competitions and achieved 11 top ten positions.

The following list is based upon the official ITU rankings and the athlete's Profile Page. Unless indicated otherwise, the following events are triathlons (Olympic Distance) and belong to the Elite category.

BG = the sponsor British Gas · DNF = did not finish · DNS = did not start

External links

 Queensland Triathlon Union

Notes

Living people
1991 births
Australian female triathletes
Sportswomen from Queensland
Olympic triathletes of Australia
Triathletes at the 2012 Summer Olympics
Triathletes at the 2014 Commonwealth Games
Sportspeople from Brisbane
Commonwealth Games medallists in triathlon
Commonwealth Games bronze medallists for Australia
People educated at St Margaret's Anglican Girls' School
20th-century Australian women
21st-century Australian women
Medallists at the 2014 Commonwealth Games